Al Mayadeen Football Club is a former Lebanese futsal club based in Beirut. Formed in 2015, they represented the Al Mayadeen TV channel in the Lebanon Futsal League. They won the league once, in 2016.

Honours
Lebanese Futsal League
Winners (1): 2015–16

References

Futsal clubs in Lebanon
Futsal clubs established in 2015
2015 establishments in Lebanon